Alessandro Frau (born 2 April 1977) is an Italian footballer who plays for Alghero.

Frau made his Serie A debut for A.S. Roma against Salernitana on 13 September 1998.

Frau was exchanged for Gianmarco Frezza from Internazionale in July 2001, but he never played for Internazionale.

After the bankrupt of S.E.F. Torres 1903, he joined Alghero.

References

External links

aic.football.it 

1977 births
Living people
People from the Province of Sassari
Italian footballers
Italy under-21 international footballers
U.S. Avellino 1912 players
A.S. Roma players
Palermo F.C. players
Pisa S.C. players
U.S. Pistoiese 1921 players
Serie A players
Association football forwards
Footballers from Sardinia
S.E.F. Torres 1903 players
Pol. Alghero players